Tualatin is a city located primarily in Washington County in the U.S. state of Oregon. A small portion of the city is also located in neighboring Clackamas County. It is a southwestern suburb in the Portland Metropolitan Area that is located south of Tigard. The population was 27,942 at the 2020 census.

History
The name of the city is taken from the Tualatin River, which flows along most of the city's northern boundary. It is probably a Native American word meaning "lazy" or "sluggish" but possibly meaning "treeless plain" for the plain near the river or "forked" for its many tributaries. According to Oregon Geographic Names, a post office with the spelling "Tualitin" was established November 5, 1869, and the spelling changed to "Tualatin" in 1915.

In the 1850s, the settlement was first called Galbreath after its founder Samuel Galbreath. In 1853, Galbreath built the first bridge over the Tualatin river, and the town became known as Bridgeport. In the 1880s, John Sweek platted a town around the new railroad depot, and named the town Tualatin. It was incorporated as the City of Tualatin in 1913.

In 1962, a fossilized Mastodon (Mammut americanum) was excavated in what is now the Fred Meyer parking lot. It is now on display in the lobby of Tualatin Public Library. In 1972 fossils were uncovered near Fanno Creek that were determined to be a partial skeleton of a Harlan's Ground Sloth (Paramylodon harlani).

Demographics

2010 census
As of the census of 2010, there were 26,054 people, 10,000 households, and 6,762 families living in the city. The racial makeup of the city was 80.4% White, 1.2% African American, 0.7% Native American, 3.5% Asian, 1.0% Pacific Islander, 8.9% from other races, and 4.2% from two or more races. Hispanic or Latino people of any race were 17.3% of the population.

There were 10,000 households, of which 37.5% had children under the age of 18 living with them, 51.6% were married couples living together, 11.4% had a female householder with no husband present, 4.6% had a male householder with no wife present, and 32.4% were non-families. 24.6% of all households were made up of individuals, and 5.3% had someone living alone who was 65 years of age or older. The average household size was 2.60 and the average family size was 3.12.

The median age in the city was 34.6 years. 26.9% of residents were under the age of 18; 8.5% were between the ages of 18 and 24; 31% were from 25 to 44; 26.8% were from 45 to 64; and 7% were 65 years of age or older. The gender makeup of the city was 49.1% male and 50.9% female.

2000 census

As of the census of 2000, there were 22,791 people, 8,651 households, and 5,804 families living in the city. The population density was 2,928.5 people per square mile (1,131.1/km). There were 9,218 housing units at an average density of 1,184.4 per square mile (457.5/km). The racial makeup of the city was 86.89% White, 0.79% African American, 0.69% Native American, 3.62% Asian, 0.37% Pacific Islander, 4.84% from other races, and 2.81% from two or more races. Hispanic or Latino people of any race were 11.85% of the population.

There were 8,651 households, out of which 39.1% had children under the age of 18 living with them, 54.1% were married couples living together, 9.3% had a female householder with no husband present, and 32.9% were non-families. 24.5% of all households were made up of individuals, and 4.6% had someone living alone who was 65 years of age or older. The average household size was 2.62 and the average family size was 3.17.

In the city, the population was spread out, with 28.2% under the age of 18, 9.4% from 18 to 24, 35.6% from 25 to 44, 21.0% from 45 to 64, and 5.8% who were 65 years of age or older. The median age was 32 years. For every 100 females, there were 99.2 males. For every 100 females age 18 and over, there were 96.8 males.

The median income for a household in the city was $55,762, and the median income for a family was $68,165. Males had a median income of $47,004 versus $32,210 for females. The per capita income for the city was $26,694. About 3.0% of families and 5.5% of the population were below the poverty line, including 4.9% of those under age 18 and 3.8% of those age 65 or over.

Geography

Economy

Tualatin is home to a majority of Bridgeport Village ("Bridgeport"), an upscale shopping area that opened in early 2005. (The northern part of Bridgeport Village is in Tigard.) Built at the site of a former quarry, Bridgeport was designed to be reminiscent of an open-air European-style shopping experience. It features an 18-screen movie theater, several national and regional chain restaurants, and many chain retail stores.

Tualatin is also home to Nyberg Woods, a neighborhood and lifestyle center located at the conjunction of Interstate 5 and Nyberg road. The center contains stores such as Best Buy, Old Navy, Golfsmith, and Ulta. Nyberg Woods also features restaurants such as Famous Dave's, Panera Bread, Chipotle, Starbucks, and Five Guys.

Tualatin also harbors Nyberg Rivers, which opened in the fall of 2014 and is the third major retail project to be developed by CenterCal Properties in Tualatin. Following the construction of Bridgeport Village and Nyberg Woods, Nyberg Rivers contains approximately 300,000 square feet of retail, restaurant, fitness, and entertainment space. Nyberg Rivers is located just off of Interstate 5 and is home to Cabela's, New Seasons Market, LA Fitness, and restaurants including Pieology, Red Robin, Dave's Hot Chicken, and Veri Bowl.

There are many factories on the south side of town, including a large Lam Research plant that makes electrochemical deposition tools for manufacturing semiconductors.

Knife manufacturers CRKT and KAI USA, which owns Kershaw and Zero Tolerance Knives, as well as Shun Cutlery are located in Tualatin. Al Mar Knives is headquartered in Tualatin, although manufacturing is done in Japan.

Oregon Scientific, a manufacturer of consumer electronics products, is headquartered in Tualatin.

From the 1960s through the 1980s, Tualatin was the home of Sunn Musical Equipment Company, a manufacturer of musical and sound reinforcement equipment.

Tualatin has been used as a filming location for Hollywood movies, including Thumbsucker, which was filmed at Tualatin High School.

Infrastructure and services
Tualatin is within the Tri-County Metropolitan Transportation District of Oregon (TriMet), the Portland metropolitan area's primary transit agency. TriMet service includes WES Commuter Rail, at Tualatin Station, and bus lines 36, 37, 38, 76, 96, and 97. Wilsonville-based South Metro Area Regional Transit's route 2X has a stop in Tualatin, at TriMet's Tualatin Park & Ride lot.

Fire protection and emergency medical services are provided through Tualatin Valley Fire and Rescue. Legacy Meridian Park Hospital is located in Tualatin.

Education
The city of Tualatin falls incompletely under the jurisdiction of the Tigard-Tualatin School District. This district contains 10 elementary schools, three middle schools, and two high schools. Of these, five are actually located within Tualatin city limits: Bridgeport Elementary School, Byrom Elementary School, Tualatin Elementary School, Hazelbrook Middle School, and Tualatin High School.

Public schools

High schools
Tualatin High School

Middle schools
 Hazelbrook Middle School

Elementary schools
 Bridgeport Elementary
 Byrom Elementary
 Tualatin Elementary

A small section of the city is part of the West Linn-Wilsonville School District. Those students usually go to the same elementary, middle, and high schools: Stafford Primary, Athey Creek Middle School, and Wilsonville High School, respectively.

Alberta Rider Elementary School on nearby Bull Mountain feeds into Twality Middle School. Students from Twality then split into either Tualatin or Tigard High School depending on zoning. Deer Creek Elementary School, which is also located on Bull Mountain, splits students between Hazelbrook or Twality Middle School. The students of Twality also split between the two high schools in this scenario.

Private schools
The Portland Japanese School, a weekend Japanese educational program for Japanese citizens and Japanese Americans, holds its classes at Hazelbrook Middle School at Tualatin. The school began holding its classes there after the school opened in 1992. The school office is in Beaverton.

The city also includes Arbor School of Arts and Sciences, an independent K-8 school, and the Christian Horizon High School.

Attractions 

 Browns Ferry Park
 Ancestry Brewing
 Lee Farms
 Bridgeport Village

Media
The Times, a weekly newspaper owned and operated by Portland-based Pamplin Media Group
Tualatin Life, a monthly newspaper focused exclusively on local news, history and human interest stories

Notable people
 Mike Barrett, sportscaster
 Jordan Chiles, gymnast
 Richard Devlin, politician, former state senator
 Ian Fuller, soccer player and coach
 Bret Harrison, actor and musician
 Taylor Hart, football player
 Wyatt Houston, football player
 Roger Levasa, football player
 Payton Pritchard, basketball player
 Roland Smith, author
 Luke Staley, football player
 Katy Steding, basketball player and coach
 Jarad van Schaik, soccer player
 Courtney Verloo, soccer player

See also
  References

External links

Tualatin Chamber of Commerce
City of Tualatin (official website)
Listing for Tualatin in the Oregon Blue Book''

UnSprawl Case Study: Tualatin Commons

 
Cities in Oregon
Cities in Clackamas County, Oregon
Cities in Washington County, Oregon
Portland metropolitan area
1869 establishments in Oregon
Populated places established in 1869